Man of the Forest was a 1920 novel by Zane Grey.

Adaptations 
The novel was adapted three times into film
 Man of the Forest (1921 film), an American film
 Man of the Forest (1926 film), an American Western silent film
 Man of the Forest (1933 film), an American pre-Code film

1920 American novels
Western (genre) novels
Novels by Zane Grey